Paradisi is a village on the northern coast of the island of Rhodes, Greece. It has a population of 2,667 inhabitants (2011 census) and is the second-largest town (after Kremasti) in the municipal unit of Petaloudes.

The island's main airport (Diagoras International Airport, IATA code: RHO) is located here.

History
During the period of the Saint John Knights occupation of the island, the magister Villeneuve made a castle in order to protect the northeastern part of the island from pirate raids. People started building around the castle. Later, Arab inhabitants brought exotic flowers and planted them along the village mountain making it look as paradise, hence the name Paradisi. After the Italian occupation, they renamed the village to Villanova only to be changed again to Paradisi after it was reclaimed by Greece.

Culture
Strawberry festival is celebrated every year, the first Sunday of May, including strawberry fruit and products from producers of Paradisi, Music and events. The feast of Saint Marina is celebrated on the 17th of July every year.

References

External links
 Official website of the Orionas youth club of Paradisi

Populated places in Rhodes